The 1997–98 Úrvalsdeild karla was the 46th season of the Úrvalsdeild karla, the top tier men's basketball league on Iceland. The season started on October 2, 1997 and ended on April 19, 1998. Njarðvík won its fourteenth title by defeating KR 3–0 in the Finals.

Competition format
The participating teams first played a conventional round-robin schedule with every team playing each opponent once "home" and once "away" for a total of 22 games. The top eight teams qualified for the championship playoffs whilst the bottom team was relegated to Division 1.

Regular season

Playoffs

References

External links
Official Icelandic Basketball Federation website
1997-1998 Úrvalsdeild statistics

Icelandic
Lea
Úrvalsdeild karla (basketball)